Heimo Hecht (born 25 April 1961) was an Austrian former sailor. He competed in the men's 470 event at the 1988 Summer Olympics.

References

External links
 

1961 births
Living people
Austrian male sailors (sport)
Olympic sailors of Austria
Sailors at the 1988 Summer Olympics – 470
People from Mödling
Sportspeople from Lower Austria